The men's team all-around  event was part of the gymnastics programme at the 1932 Summer Olympics. It was the seventh appearance of the event, which was established in 1904. The competition was held from Monday, August 8, 1932, to Wednesday, August 10, 1932. Twenty-four gymnasts from five nations competed.

Medalists

Results

An obligatory and a voluntary exercise was performed on every of the five different apparatuses: horizontal bar, parallel bars, pommel horse, flying rings (rings), and long horse vaulting (vault). The results based on points from the individual all-around. The best four individual total scores count towards team score.

References

External links
 Olympic Report
 

All-round team